The following places were named for their main products:
 Açailândia, Brazil (from the açaí palm)
 Alumínio, Brazil
 Apatity, Russia
 Asbest, Russia
 Asbestos, Canada
 Batu Arang, Selangor, Malaysia (from Batu Arang, "coal" in Malay)
 Birżebbuġa, Malta (from żebbuġ, "olives")
 Brazil, from brazilwood.
 Carbon County, Utah from the coal mined there.
 Coal Center, Pennsylvania
 Coal City, Illinois
 Copperton, Utah named for the copper processing plants build there
 Côte d'Ivoire
 Diamantina, Brazil
 El Nido, Palawan, Philippines (Spanish for nest, or edible bird's nest)
 Elektrėnai, Lithuania
 Elektrostal, Russia (from the plant of the same name, stal meaning "steel")
 Fermont, Canada (French contraction of "Fer Mont", meaning "Iron Mountain" named for exploited iron ore deposits in Mont Wright)
Gangcheng, Shandong, China (钢城, literally "the town of steel", gang 钢 meaning "steel" and cheng 城 meaning "city" or "town")
 Gas, Kansas
 Glassport, Pennsylvania
 Gloversville, New York
 Irondale Township, Minnesota and Ironton, Minnesota
 Iron City, Tennessee
 Iron County, Utah named for the iron mines operating there
 Iron Mountain, Michigan
 Kant, Kyrgyzstan (from kant, "sugar")
 Kappara, Malta (Maltese for "caper")
 Lime Ridge, Pennsylvania, a supplier of limestone. 
 Mastichochoria, Greece, from the mastic tree and resin.
 Mellieħa, Malta (from melħ, "salt")
 Mountain Iron, Minnesota, named after Mountain Iron Mine
 Nikel, Russia
 Nitro, West Virginia
 Oil City, Pennsylvania
 Oildale, California
 Ouro Preto, Brazil (Portuguese for "black gold")
 Saffron Walden, Essex, UK
 Salzburg, Austria, and many other German-speaking places beginning with Salz- (salt)
Silverton, New South Wales, Australia
 Steelton, Pennsylvania
 Tabaco, Philippines (Spanish for tobacco, the city's traditional product)
Tongling, Anhui, China (铜陵, literally "copper hills", tong 铜 meaning "copper" and ling 陵 meaning "hills")
 Uglegorsk, Sakhalin Oblast, Russia (from ugol, "coal")
 Vale do Aço, Brazil (Portuguese for "steel valley")
 Żebbuġ, Malta and Żebbuġ, Gozo (Maltese for "olives")
 Żejtun, Malta (Siculo-Arabic for "olives")

References

product